The 2006 Phillip Island Superbike World Championship round was the second round of the 2006 Superbike World Championship. It took place over the weekend of 3–5 March 2006 at the Phillip Island Grand Prix Circuit near Cowes, Victoria, Australia.

Results

Superbike race 1 classification

Superbike race 2 classification

Supersport race classification

References
 Superbike Race 1
 Superbike Race 2
 Supersport Race

Motorsport at Phillip Island
Superbike World Championship round
Philip Island